Pioneer Park is a 44-acre (109-ha) city park in Fairbanks, Alaska, United States run by the Fairbanks North Star Borough Department of Parks and Recreation. The park commemorates early Alaskan history with multiple museums and historic displays on site. The park is located along the Chena River and is accessible from Peger and Airport Roads. A waterfront path connects the park to the Carlson Center, Growden Memorial Park and downtown Fairbanks. There is no admission fee to enter the park, though many of the museums and attractions do charge an entrance fee. Concessions are open from Memorial Day weekend through Labor Day, though the park is open year round and some events are held in the off-season. Free Wi-Fi is available.

History
Pioneer Park was opened in 1967 as Alaska 67 Centennial Exposition to celebrate the centennial of the Alaska Purchase. After being given first to the state and then to the city, Mayor Red Boucher renamed the site Alaskaland. It was then changed to its present name in 2001 out of concern that the park could be mistaken for being primarily a theme park. The subject is still a topic of slight contention with locals.

Attractions

Alaska Centennial Center for the Arts – theater, art gallery, and meeting hall.
Crooked Creek & Whiskey Island Railroad – operating  narrow gauge railroad which circumnavigates the park.
Denali Observation car (or "Harding Railroad Car") – the rail car used by President Warren G. Harding during a visit to Alaska in 1923 to formally complete the Alaska Railroad.
Fairbanks Arts Association – a non-profit organization set up to promote contemporary and traditional arts in Interior Alaska.
Gold Rush Town – 35 restored buildings from early Fairbanks, including the first church in Fairbanks and a house owned by Judge James Wickersham. Most now house gift shops and other merchants.
Mini Golf Fairbanks – America's northernmost 36 hole Mini Golf Course.
Mining Valley – contains working replica of a gold rush-era sluice gate.
Pioneer Air Museum – aviation memorabilia and 14 aircraft; begun through the efforts of aviation historian Randy Acord.
Pioneer Hall – designed to resemble an early-20th-century meeting hall. Includes the Pioneer Museum, which features Gold Rush memorabilia and the "Big Stampede" mural presentation.
Replica Alaska Native village featuring artifacts.
Replica of the wheelhouse of SS Lavelle Young, the steamer used by Fairbanks founder E.T. Barnette to reach the site of the settlement.
SS Nenana – a sternwheeler that carried passengers and cargo on the Tanana and Yukon rivers from 1933 to 1954. At  it is the second-longest wooden-hulled ship still in existence. Now a museum.
Tanana Valley Railroad Museum – opened in 2006 and features the restored,  narrow gauge 1899 TVRR Engine No. 1, the oldest working steam locomotive in Alaska and still operated on occasion by volunteers.

See also

Other locations with historic trains in a non-historic setting:
Clark's Trading Post
Rail transport in Walt Disney Parks and Resorts

References

External links

Pioneer Park Web site
Pioneer Air Museum

1967 establishments in Alaska
Heritage railroads in Alaska
Museums in Fairbanks, Alaska
Parks in Alaska
Protected areas established in 1967
Protected areas of Fairbanks North Star Borough, Alaska
Railroad museums in Alaska
Tourist attractions in Fairbanks, Alaska